The following is a list of national American television and radio networks and announcers that have broadcast World Series games over the years, as well as local flagship radio stations that have aired them since 1982.

Television
Television coverage of the World Series began in 1947. Since that time, eight different men have called eight or more different World Series telecasts as either a play-by-play announcer or color commentator. They are (through 2022) Joe Buck (24), Tim McCarver (24), Curt Gowdy (12), Mel Allen (11), Vin Scully (11), Joe Garagiola (10), Tony Kubek (8), and Al Michaels (8).

2020s

Per the current broadcast agreement, the World Series will be televised by Fox through 2028.

2010s

Notes
2010 – For the second consecutive year, World Series games had earlier start times in hopes of attracting younger viewers. First pitch was just before 8 p.m. EDT for Games 1–2, and 5, while Game 3 started at 7 p.m. EDT. Game 4, however, started at 8:22 p.m. EDT to accommodate Fox's football coverage of the game between the Tampa Bay Buccaneers and Arizona Cardinals. Many viewers in the New York City and Philadelphia markets were unable to watch Games 1 and 2 because News Corporation, Fox's parent company, pulled WNYW and WTXF from cable provider Cablevision on October 16 because of a carriage dispute. The agreement was reached just before Game 3.
MLB International syndicated its own telecast of the series, with announcers Gary Thorne and Rick Sutcliffe, to various networks outside the U.S. ESPN America broadcast the series live in the UK and in Europe. Additionally, the American Forces Network and Canadian Forces Radio and Television carried the games to U.S. and Canadian service personnel stationed around the globe. Fox Deportes carried the Series in Spanish on American cable and satellite TV.
The overall national Nielsen rating for the five games was 8.4, tied with the 2008 World Series for the event's lowest-ever TV rating. Game 4 was beaten in the ratings by a Pittsburgh Steelers–New Orleans Saints game on NBC Sunday Night Football, the first time a World Series game was outdrawn by a regular-season NFL contest airing in the same time slot.
The 2011 World Series was televised in the United States and Canada by Fox. Ken Rosenthal served as field reporter for the games, while Chris Rose hosted the pregame and postgame coverage with analysts A. J. Pierzynski and Eric Karros.
MLB International syndicated television coverage of the 2011 World Series (with Gary Thorne and Rick Sutcliffe announcing) to viewers outside of North America.
In the United States, Fox televised the 2012 World Series, with Joe Buck calling play-by-play in his 15th World Series, and Tim McCarver handling color commentary for his 23rd World Series. Ken Rosenthal also appeared on the Fox telecasts as a field reporter, with Erin Andrews and Chris Myers joining him for select games.
MLB International syndicated its own telecast of the series, with announcers Gary Thorne and Rick Sutcliffe, to various networks outside the U.S. Additionally, the American Forces Network and Canadian Forces Radio and Television carried the games to U.S. and Canadian service personnel stationed around the globe. Fox Deportes carried the Series in Spanish on American cable and satellite TV. 
On August 24, Tribune removed affiliate WTIC from Cablevision systems in Connecticut, causing viewers to miss Games 1 and 2 of the series. An agreement between Cablevision and Tribune was reached on October 26, the day before Game 3.
According to Nielsen Media Research, the four-game series on Fox averaged a record-low 7.6 rating and 12 share. The previous low was an 8.4 rating for both the 2008 and the 2010 World Series, which each went five games. The 6.1 rating in Game 3 matched the lowest rating for any World Series game with Game 3 in 2008; that year, a rain delay moved the start of the game to after 10 p.m. on the East Coast with the game not ending until 1:47 a.m.
The 2013 World Series was Tim McCarver's final World Series as a broadcaster, as he announced that he would retire after the season. A partnership with Fox Sports featured Pearl Jam as the November artist of month for all entities within the Fox Sports domain and license 48 songs from their catalogue to play during the 2013 World Series.  Their music was included in anything from "opening teases and commercial bumpers to montages, as well as additional promotional inventory across Fox prime-time and cable."
Major League Baseball International syndicated the television coverage outside Canada and the U.S., with English-language commentary provided by Baltimore Orioles play-by-play announcer Gary Thorne and ESPN analyst Rick Sutcliffe.
2014 World Series – Fox Deportes offered a Spanish-language telecast of the series, with Pablo Alsina, Duaner Sánchez, and José Tolentino commentating. MLB International televised the series outside the U.S. and Canada, with Gary Thorne and Rick Sutcliffe announcing.
The World Series started on a Tuesday for the first time since 1990, instead of a Wednesday as in previous years. The change also meant that the series only had to compete with the National Football League on one night (Sunday) instead of three (Thursday, Sunday, and Monday).
The 2014 World Series averaged an 8.3/14 rating, making it the second-worst rated World Series in Major League Baseball history. Through six games, the series was averaging 7.4, which would have made it the worst-rated World Series, but Game 7 produced a respectable 13.7 to bolster the series average enough to avoid the notorious distinction. The 2014 World Series set records for lowest-rated Games 1, 4, 5, 6, and 7 in World Series history. The previous Game 7 in World Series history occurred in 2011, when the St. Louis Cardinals and Texas Rangers produced a 14.7 rating, a full 1.0 over 2014's Game 7. 2014 is the 5th consecutive year in which the World Series rating was under 10.0 and the 6th in the last 7th.
2015 – Fox suffered an outage during their broadcast of Game 1, resulting in a loss of coverage for 15 minutes, followed a 5-minute delay in-game while officials addressed the availability of video review due to the loss of Fox's feed. The teams agreed to allow the use of footage from MLB International's world feed of the game for video review, while Fox also temporarily switched to the MLB International feed with Matt Vasgersian and John Smoltz, later replaced by Joe Buck, Harold Reynolds, and Tom Verducci before the main Fox Sports production was restored.
Fox Deportes also aired the 2016 World Series and provided a Spanish-language simulcast over-the-air via Fox's SAP audio, with Carlos Álvarez and Duaner Sánchez announcing. Sportsnet in English and RDS in French televised the series in Canada. Sportsnet used the MLB International feed produced by the MLB Network; Matt Vasgersian was MLB International's play-by-play announcer with the Toronto Blue Jays' play-by-play announcer Buck Martinez as their color analyst and MLB Network correspondent Lauren Shehadi and analyst Mark DeRosa as field reporters. Alain Usereau and former Montreal Expos player Marc Griffin handled the French-language telecast for RDS. BT Sport televised the series live in the United Kingdom and Ireland. WAPA-TV transmitted the series to Puerto Rico, with Rafael Bracero at the helm of the station's sports commentary of the series.
Initial reports often utilize "fast national" ratings, which are subject to revision. Game 7 had over 40 million viewers, the largest audience for a baseball game since Game 7 of the 1991 World Series, while the series as a whole was the first to average double-digit ratings nationally since .

2000s

Notes
The 2000 World Series telecast on Fox was the first year of their exclusive coverage of the World Series (although the new contract technically began the next year). As in previous World Series televised by the network, Joe Buck called the play-by-play, with Tim McCarver (himself a Yankees broadcaster and a former Mets broadcaster) and Bob Brenly (who was a on-field analyst) serving as color commentators. This World Series was Brenly's last broadcast for Fox, as he left to become manager of the Arizona Diamondbacks and, incidentally, go on to defeat the New York Yankees in the World Series the following year. Brenly returned to broadcasting in 2005 as part of the Chicago Cubs broadcasts on NBC Sports Chicago and WGN, and also has called postseason games for TBS.
2001 – For the second consecutive year, Fox carried the World Series over its network with its top broadcast team, Joe Buck and Tim McCarver (himself a former New York Yankees broadcaster). This was the first year of Fox's exclusive rights to the World Series (in the previous contract, Fox only broadcast the World Series in even numbered years while NBC broadcast it in odd numbered years), which it has held ever since (this particular contract also had given Fox exclusive rights to the entire baseball postseason, which aired over its family of networks; the contract was modified following Disney's purchase of Fox Family Channel shortly after the World Series ended, as ESPN regained their postseason rights following a year of postseason games on ABC Family, Fox Family's successor).
Fox's telecast of the 2002 World Series marked the first time the World Series was telecast in high-definition.
The 2004 World Series was broadcast by Fox, and the announcers were Joe Buck and Tim McCarver. Jeanne Zelasko covered the pre-game build up to all four games and the presentation of the World Series trophy.
An average of 23.1 million people watched Game 1. These were the highest television ratings for the opening game of a World Series in five years and had the highest average number of viewers since 1996. It was also the highest rated broadcast on any network in the past ten months. The ratings for the first two games were also the highest average since 1996, and the average for the first three games was the highest since 1999. Game 3 had the highest average number of viewers with 24.4 million, since 1996 when 28.7 million watched the Atlanta Braves and New York Yankees. It was also the Fox network's highest rating for a Game 3 of a World Series ever. Game 4 posted an 18.2 national rating giving the series an overall average of 15.8. This was the highest average in five years, and the average number of viewers of 25.4 million, was the highest since 1995.
2006 – Games 1, 3 and 4 set all-time lows for television ratings, with Game 4 falling 20% from the previous year's Game 4.  The Series as a whole was also the lowest-rated ever, with the four games averaging a Nielsen rating of only 10.0 and a share of 17. By contrast, the six games of the 1980 Series—in the pre-cable television era—garnered a record-high rating of 32.8 and a share of 56.
The starting time for each television broadcast was 8 pm EDT/6 pm MDT.
2007 – The starting time for each television broadcast was 8 pm EDT (6 pm MDT). The series broke with the recent tradition of starting the World Series on a Saturday, as Major League Baseball had become convinced that weekend games drew lower television ratings. Prior to this season, every World Series since 1985 had opened on a Saturday, with the exception of the 1990 World Series. Rogers Sportsnet (RSN) in Canada used the MLB International feed with Dave O'Brien and Rick Sutcliffe as booth announcers. NASN showed the games live to most of Europe, while in the United Kingdom, all games were shown terrestrially on Five. NHK aired the Series in Japan.
During Fox's broadcast of Game 3 of the 2007 World Series between the Colorado Rockies and Boston Red Sox, a blackout occurred during the top half of the seventh inning, resulting in the disruption of a key moment in the game.
2008 – All games were televised on Fox in the United States with Joe Buck and Tim McCarver (himself a former Philadelphia Phillies broadcaster) as booth announcers and Chris Myers and Ken Rosenthal as field reporters. Jeanne Zelasko hosted the pre-game and post-game show with Kevin Kennedy and Mark Grace (in Tampa) or Eric Karros (in Philadelphia). Fox Deportes did the simulcast of the Series in Spanish-language with Ángel Torres, Miguel Morales and Cos Villa behind the microphones. Fox's broadcasts were also streamed online at MLB.com.
For international viewers, MLB International televised the game with commentators Rick Sutcliffe and Dave O'Brien. This feed was also carried to U.S. service personnel stationed around the globe via the American Forces Network.
Game 1 of the 2008 World Series was watched by 10.1 million viewers in the United States; Commissioner Bud Selig stated he was satisfied with the ratings. Overall viewership was 25% lower than the previous World Series.
Game 5 on October 27 was postponed after the top of the sixth inning due to rain. When the game finally resumed on October 29, the start of the game was delayed by 15 minutes so that a 30-minute paid advertisement for U.S. Democratic Presidential candidate Barack Obama could be aired on Fox, CBS, and NBC.
Game 1 of the 2009 World Series was watched by 19.5 million viewers, second only to the opening of the 2004 World Series in viewership for a series opener since 2000. The viewership for the opening game resulted in a ratings percentage of 11.9% of households in the United States. Game 4 produced the highest ratings of the series with 22.8 million viewers, the highest for any World Series game since 2004 and the highest for a "non-decisive Game 4" since 2003.
Fox Deportes also broadcast the Series for the US Spanish-speaking audience.

1990s

Notes
The  postseason started on a Thursday, while the World Series started on a Tuesday due to the brief lockout.
This was the first of four consecutive World Series to be televised on CBS. From 1976 to 1989, World Series telecasts alternated between ABC (in odd numbered years) and NBC (in even numbered years).
In 1990, CBS field reporter Lesley Visser became the first female sportscaster to cover a World Series.
All World Series games from 1981 to 1996 were televised in Canada on CTV, using the feed from the US network broadcaster. 
In 1991, CBS used three field reporters: Jim Kaat (both teams and covering the trophy presentation), Lesley Visser (Twins' dugout) and Andrea Joyce (Braves' dugout). This was also the last World Series to be broadcast by Jack Buck (who was replaced by Sean McDonough on the CBS telecasts in the role of lead play-by-play man).
The World Series telecast drew an overall national Nielsen rating of 24.0 and a 39 share for CBS. Game 7 drew a 32.2 rating and 49 share; as of 2012, no subsequent World Series game has approached either number in national TV ratings.
In 1992, at 30 years of age, CBS' Sean McDonough became the youngest man to call all nine innings and games of a World Series while serving as a full network television employee. Although Vin Scully and Al Michaels were several years younger when they called their first World Series, they were products of the then broadcasting policy of announcers representing the participating teams (a process that ended following the 1976 World Series). McDonough's record was subsequently be broken by Fox's Joe Buck, who at 27 years of age, called the 1996 World Series. Coincidentally, McDonough replaced Joe Buck's father, Jack, as CBS' lead play-by-play man.
Game 6 of the 1993 World Series (October 23), is to date, the last Major League Baseball game to be televised on CBS. Sean McDonough (play-by-play) and Tim McCarver (color commentary and himself a former Phillies broadcaster) called the action for CBS. The following season, Major League Baseball entered into a revenue sharing joint venture with ABC and NBC called The Baseball Network. CBS' Andrea Joyce became the first woman to co-host (alongside Pat O'Brien) a World Series. Serving as field reporters for CBS were Lesley Visser (in the Blue Jays' dugout) and Jim Gray (in the Phillies' dugout).
The 1995 World Series was broadcast on two networks (ABC and NBC) so that they could recoup losses in the aftermath of the 1994–95 strike. The arrangement was a compromise from both networks, which chose to opt out of a six-year revenue sharing deal with Major League Baseball called "The Baseball Network." Prior to the strike, ABC was scheduled to broadcast the 1994 World Series and NBC was scheduled to televise the 1995 World Series. For 1995, ABC and NBC alternated games; ABC cover Games 1, 4, and 5 (and would have aired Game 7 if it was needed), while NBC covered Games 2, 3 and 6.
Also during the 1995 World Series, NBC's Hannah Storm was the first woman to serve as solo host of a World Series, and the first to preside over a World Series trophy presentation.
For Game 2 of the 1996 World Series (rescheduled to Monday night due to a rainout), Fox used an early start (7:00 p.m. Eastern Time) to minimize the overlap with Monday Night Football on ABC.
The Atlanta Braves became the first Major League Baseball team to appear in World Series broadcast on all four major networks (NBC in 1957–1958 and 1995, ABC in 1995, CBS in 1991–1992, and Fox in 1996. The Philadelphia Phillies have since duplicated this feat (NBC in 1950 and 1980, ABC in 1983, CBS in 1993 and Fox in 2008–2009).
1997 – This marked the first time since  that NBC televised a World Series in its entirety. In , NBC televised Games 2, 3, and 6, while rival ABC televised Games 1, 4, and 5, having split that series since ABC was promised the strike-cancelled 1994 World Series. Both networks had announced prior to the 1995 season, that they were bailing out what was initially, a six-year-long revenue sharing joint venture with Major League Baseball called "The Baseball Network". NBC's West Coast president Don Ohlmeyer disturbed Major League Baseball when he publicly wished the World Series to end in a four-game sweep so that it wouldn't derail NBC's fall entertainment schedule. (Game 5 fell on a Thursday, which had long been the highest rated night on NBC's schedule, if not on all of television.)
Game 7 of the 1997 World Series caused a scheduled Chicago Bears-Miami Dolphins game to be postponed to Monday night. It was seen on ABC only in the Chicago and Miami markets and was intended to air on Fox. The rest of the United States received the scheduled Green Bay Packers–New England Patriots game, the only time a rematch of a previous season's Super Bowl aired on ABC.
The 1999 World Series was NBC's 39th and, to date, final World Series telecast. Fox aired the next World Series as part of the contract in place, and Fox acquired the exclusive broadcast rights of Major League Baseball beginning in 2001. With the Knicks having played in the NBA Finals in June, this was the second championship series in 1999 that NBC broadcast involving teams from New York. Bob Costas, Jim Gray, and Hannah Storm were involved both times. Costas with play-by-play, Gray as a reporter, and Storm as pre-game host. Prior to Cleveland in 2016, this was the most recent year of a same city hosting both NBA Finals and World Series in the same year.

1980s

Notes
1980 – Locally, the NBC feed was carried in Philadelphia by WPHL-TV, the Phillies' flagship TV station, and KYW-TV, the Philadelphia NBC station; and in Kansas City by WDAF-TV, the Royals' flagship TV station as well as the Kansas City NBC station.
This series is tied with the 1978 World Series for the highest overall television ratings to date, with the six games averaging a Nielsen rating of 32.8 and a share of 56.
Although Bryant Gumbel anchored NBC's pregame coverage for Game 5 of series, he was not present at Kansas City's Royals Stadium. Game 5 landed on a Sunday, which created conflict with Gumbel's NFL '80 hosting duties. As a result, Gumbel had to anchor the World Series coverage from NBC's studios in New York City. Gumbel however, would be present in Philadelphia's Veterans Stadium for Game 6, which turned out to be the clincher for the Phillies.
1981 – Locally, the ABC feed was carried in Los Angeles by KTTV, the Dodgers' flagship TV station, and KABC-TV, the Los Angeles ABC station; and in New York by WPIX, the Yankees' flagship TV station, and WABC-TV, the New York City ABC station.
1982 – Locally, the NBC feed was carried in St. Louis by KSDK, the Cardinals' flagship station as well as the St. Louis NBC station; and in Milwaukee by WVTV, the Brewers' flagship TV station, and WTMJ-TV, the Milwaukee NBC station.
Dick Enberg and Joe Garagiola traded off play-by-play duties (just as Garagiola and Tony Kubek had done for NBC's previous two World Series broadcasts). Garagiola called the first three and last three innings of each game. Enberg, meanwhile, hosted the pregame show and then called the middle innings.
1983 – Locally, the ABC feed was carried in Baltimore by WMAR-TV, the Orioles' flagship TV station, and WJZ-TV, the Baltimore ABC station; and in Philadelphia by WTAF-TV, the Phillies' flagship TV station, and WPVI-TV, the Philadelphia ABC station. (This was the last year in which the participating teams' regular-season flagship TV stations were permitted to simulcast the network feed of the World Series even if they were not affiliated with that network. Beginning in 1984 the network affiliates would have Series exclusivity in every city.)
This was the last World Series aired on ABC before the network was taken over by Capital Cities Communications (coincidentally, that company's flagship station was Philadelphia's ABC affiliate, WPVI-TV—also the network's first affiliate).
At the time, ABC had a policy preventing an announcer who was employed by a team from working games involving that team. So whenever the Orioles were on the primary ABC game (ABC during this period, broadcast Monday night games), Weaver worked the backup game. This policy forced Weaver to resign from the Orioles' consulting position in October in order to be able to work the Series telecasts for ABC.
The 1984 World Series was scheduled to start in the National League park. But Major League Baseball actually had a contingency plan to instead start the World Series in the American League park in the event that the Chicago Cubs won the National League Championship Series against the San Diego Padres. This would have allowed the Wrigley Field-hosted (i.e. daytime) games to be held over the weekend. In return, only one prime time game (Game 3 on Friday) would have been lost. Wrigley Field wouldn't have lights installed until four years later. In other words, had the Cubs advanced to the Series instead of the Padres, the Detroit Tigers would have hosted Games 1–2, and 6–7 (on Tuesday and Wednesday nights), while the Cubs would have hosted Games 3–5 (on Friday, Saturday and Sunday), with all three games in Chicago starting no later than 1:30 p.m. Central Time.
 marked the first time that all World Series games were aired in prime time. Since 1985 marked the first year of the League Championship Series having a best-of-seven format, Game 1 started on a Saturday. Tim McCarver (who was originally slated to be a roving World Series reporter) was practically a last minute replacement for Howard Cosell on ABC's coverage. Cosell was removed from the telecasts on the eve of the World Series (October 18), by order of Jim Spence and Roone Arledge (the then Vice President and President of ABC Sports respectively) after the excerpts from Cosell's book (I Never Played the Game), which criticized colleagues at ABC, first appeared in TV Guide.
1986 – NBC preceded its broadcast of Game 5 by airing an episode of The Cosby Show (at the time the network's top-rated prime time series) in lieu of a pregame show.
Vin Scully's call of the final play in Game 6 would quickly become an iconic one to baseball fans, with the normally calm Scully growing increasingly excited:  Scully then remained silent for more than three minutes, letting the pictures and the crowd noise tell the story. Scully resumed with: 
Game 6 caused the first-ever preemption of Saturday Night Live, due to extra innings. Ron Darling explained that when the Mets entered the locker room, they were informed to their dismay that they'd inadvertently caused the first delay in SNLs (then) 11-year history; the delayed episode was aired two weeks later on November 8.
NBC's broadcast of Game 7 (which went up against a Monday Night Football game between the Washington Redskins and New York Giants on ABC) garnered a Nielsen rating of 38.9 and a 55 share, making it the highest-rated single World Series game to date. Game 7 was scheduled for Sunday, but a rain-out forced the game to Monday.
Game 6 of the 1987 World Series (played on Saturday, October 24) was the last World Series game to not be played in prime time (ironically, the game was played in the Metrodome even though it took place under artificial illumination all the same). The game started at 4 p.m. Eastern Time.
The 1988 World Series marked the last time that NBC would televise a World Series for seven years. After splitting coverage of the 1995 World Series with ABC, NBC would next cover a World Series exclusively in 1997.
Longtime Los Angeles Dodgers' broadcaster Vin Scully called the 1988 World Series for a national television audience on NBC with Joe Garagiola. Unknown to the fans and the media at the time, Kirk Gibson was watching the game on television while undergoing physical therapy in the Dodgers' clubhouse. At some point during the game, television cameras scanned the Dodgers dugout and Scully, observed that Gibson was nowhere to be found. This spurred Gibson to tell Dodgers manager Tommy Lasorda that he was available to pinch hit. Gibson immediately returned to the batting cage in the clubhouse to take practice swings. Bob Costas, who along with Marv Albert, hosted NBC's World Series pregame coverage and handled postgame interviews made on-air statements that enraged many in the Dodgers' clubhouse (especially manager Tommy Lasorda). After the Dodgers won Game 4, Lasorda (during a postgame interview with Marv Albert) sarcastically said that the MVP of the World Series should be Bob Costas. While Kirk Gibson was taking practice swings in the Dodgers' clubhouse during Game 1, Orel Hershiser set up the hitting tee for his teammate. Along the way, Costas could hear Gibson's agonized-sounding grunts after every hit. Costas said that the 1988 Dodgers possibly had the weakest hitting line-up in World Series history.
The following is Vin Scully's call of Kirk Gibson's game inning home run in Game 1 of the 1988 World Series:  Scully made repeated references to Gibson's legs, noting at one point that the batter was "shaking his left leg, making it quiver, like a horse trying to get rid of a troublesome fly." Gibson worked the count to 3–2 as Mike Davis stole second base; the camera turned at that point to Steve Sax getting ready for his turn at the plate, and Scully reminded the viewers that Sax waiting on deck but the game right now is at the plate. He then said:  Scully said nothing for over a minute, allowing the pictures to tell the story. Finally, he said:  Returning to the subject of Gibson's banged-up legs during a replay, Scully joked,  As NBC showed a replay of Gibson rounding second base in his home run trot, Scully then made a point to note Eckersley's pitching performance throughout the 1988 season, to put things in perspective. 
Game 3 of the 1989 World Series (initially scheduled for October 17) was delayed by 10 days due to the Loma Prieta earthquake. The earthquake struck at approximately 5:04 p.m. Pacific Time. After about a 15-minute delay (ABC aired a rerun of Roseanne and subsequently, The Wonder Years in the meantime), ABC was able to regain power via a backup generator. ABC's play-by-play man, Al Michaels (who was familiar with the San Francisco Bay Area dating back to his days working for the San Francisco Giants from 1974–1976) then proceeded to relay reports to Ted Koppel at ABC News' headquarters in Washington, D.C. Al Michaels was ultimately be nominated for an Emmy for his on-site reporting at the World Series. NBC News also began continuous coverage, with Tom Brokaw, about an hour later. KGO-TV, an owned and operated station of the American Broadcasting Company, later won a Peabody Award for their news coverage, as did radio station KCBS (AM). In Los Angeles, also an ABC owned and operated station KABC chose not to air the network feed. It aired its own coverage, anchored by Mark Coogan. However, some network footage was incorporated into its coverage.
This was the last World Series that ABC televised from start to finish (and also the last they would produce themselves) and the last MLB game on ABC, period, until July 1994. The television rights would move exclusively (ABC had shared coverage with NBC since  up until the end of the 1989 season) to CBS the following year. ABC would next televise a World Series in 1995, but only broadcast Games 1, 4, and 5 (the other games were covered by NBC, who had a joint venture with ABC and MLB called The Baseball Network). Due in part to the earthquake and subsequent interruption of play, combined with the four-game sweep by the A's, ABC only drew an overall Nielsen rating of 16.4 for the Series. This was the first World Series since the introduction of prime-time games in 1971 to draw a rating of less than 20.

1970s

Notes
1970 – Locally, the NBC feed was carried in Baltimore by WJZ-TV, the Orioles' flagship TV station, and WBAL-TV, the Baltimore NBC station; and in Cincinnati by WLWT, the Reds' flagship TV station as well as the Cincinnati NBC station.
1971 – Locally, the NBC feed was carried in Pittsburgh by KDKA-TV, the Pirates' flagship TV station, and WIIC, the Pittsburgh NBC station; and in Baltimore by WJZ-TV, the Orioles' flagship TV station, and WBAL-TV, the Baltimore NBC station.
Game 4 of the 1971 World Series was the first World Series game to be aired in prime time.
1972 – Locally, the NBC feed was carried in Oakland by KBHK-TV, the Athletics' flagship TV station, and KRON-TV, the Bay Area NBC station; and in Cincinnati by WLWT, the Reds' flagship TV station as well as the Cincinnati NBC station.
 NBC aired the soap opera Return to Peyton Place prior to game 5, the first time that NBC had skipped the pregame show before a Series game (a move the network would not repeat until 1986 with The Cosby Show). This move was necessitated by the fact that Game 3 was rained out, forcing Game 5 to be played on a Friday, originally scheduled as a travel day.
1973 – Locally, the NBC feed was carried in New York by WOR-TV, the Mets' flagship TV station, and WNBC-TV, the New York City NBC station; and in Oakland by KTVU, the Athletics' flagship TV station, and KRON-TV, the Bay Area NBC station.
1974 – Locally, the NBC feed was carried in Oakland by KTVU, the Athletics' flagship TV station, and KRON-TV, the Bay Area NBC station; and in Los Angeles by KTTV, the Dodgers' flagship TV station, and KNBC-TV, the Los Angeles NBC station.
1975 – Locally, the NBC feed was carried in Cincinnati by WLWT, the Reds' flagship TV station as well as the Cincinnati NBC station; and in Boston by WSBK-TV, the Red Sox' flagship TV station, and WBZ-TV, the Boston NBC station.
1976 – Locally, the NBC feed was carried in New York by WPIX, the Yankees' flagship TV station, and WNBC-TV, the New York City NBC station; and in Cincinnati by WLWT, the Reds' flagship TV station as well as the Cincinnati NBC station.
1977 – Locally, the ABC feed was carried in Los Angeles by KTTV, the Dodgers' flagship TV station, and KABC-TV, the Los Angeles ABC station; and in New York by WPIX, the Yankees' flagship TV station, and WABC-TV, the New York City ABC station.
Beginning in  the participating teams' local announcers were no longer featured as booth announcers on the network telecast of a World Series.
Also in 1977, Yankees announcer Bill White and Dodgers announcer Ross Porter split pre-game and post-game duties on ABC, with White working the telecasts for the games in New York (including the clubhouse trophy presentation ceremony after Game 6) and Porter doing likewise for the games in Los Angeles. (The pair also worked on CBS Radio's coverage of the Series, with Porter doing play-by-play of the games in New York and White the games in Los Angeles.)
1978 – Locally, the NBC feed was carried in New York by WPIX, the Yankees' flagship TV station, and WNBC-TV, the New York City NBC station; and in Los Angeles by KTTV, the Dodgers' flagship TV station, and KNBC-TV, the Los Angeles NBC station.
1979 – Locally, the ABC feed was carried in Pittsburgh by KDKA-TV, the Pirates' flagship TV station, and WTAE-TV, the Pittsburgh ABC station; and in Baltimore by WMAR-TV, the Orioles' flagship TV station, and WJZ-TV, the Baltimore ABC station.
Jackson did the games at the American League park while Michaels would come in for the games at the National League park. This arrangement was made in large part to work around Jackson's already busy schedule (which included being ABC's lead college football announcer). By , Al Michaels was finally promoted to the full-time spot of lead baseball play-by-play man for ABC.

1960s

Notes
1960 – Locally, the NBC feed was carried in New York by WPIX, the Yankees' flagship TV station, and WNBC-TV, the New York City NBC affiliate; and in Pittsburgh by WIIC, the Pittsburgh NBC affiliate.
As mentioned several times here, prior to the mid-1970s, television networks and stations generally didn't preserve their telecasts of sporting events, choosing instead to tape over them. As a result, the broadcasts of six of the seven 1960 games are no longer known to exist. The lone exception is a black-and-white kinescope of the entire telecast of Game 7, which was discovered in a wine cellar in Bing Crosby's home in Hillsborough, California in December 2009. A part-owner of the Pittsburgh Pirates, who was too superstitious to watch the Series live, Crosby listened to the decisive contest with his wife Kathryn and two friends on a shortwave radio in Paris, France. Wanting to watch the game at a later date only if the Pirates won, he arranged for a company to record it. After viewing the kinescope, he placed it in his wine cellar, where it went untouched for 49 years. It was finally found by Robert Bader, vice president of marketing and production for Bing Crosby Enterprises, while looking through videotapes of Crosby's television specials which were to be transferred to DVD. The five-reel set is the only known complete copy of the historic match, which was originally broadcast in color. The NBC television announcers for the Series were Bob Prince and Mel Allen, the primary play-by-play voices for the Pirates and New York Yankees respectively. Prince called the first half of Game 7, while Allen did the rest of the game.
1961 – Locally, the NBC feed was carried in Cincinnati by WLWT, the Reds' flagship TV station as well as the Cincinnati NBC affiliate; and in New York by WPIX, the Yankees' flagship TV station, and WNBC-TV, the New York City NBC affiliate.
In contrast to preceding years, in which NBC's World Series telecasts featured two announcers (usually one from each participating team) who split the play-by-play, each working his portion of the game by himself, in 1961 NBC had Yankees announcer Mel Allen handle all of the play-by-play on television (with Reds announcer Waite Hoyt confined to radio) while Joe Garagiola provided color commentary. This format eventually became the standard form of presentation on World Series telecasts.
1962 – Locally, the NBC feed was carried in New York by WPIX, the Yankees' flagship TV station, and WNBC-TV, the New York City NBC affiliate; and in San Francisco by KTVU-TV, the Giants' flagship TV station, and KRON-TV, the San Francisco NBC affiliate.
1963 – Locally, the NBC feed was carried in Los Angeles by KTTV, the Dodgers' flagship TV station, and KNBC, the Los Angeles NBC affiliate; and in New York by WPIX, the Yankees' flagship TV station, and WNBC-TV, the New York City NBC affiliate.
During the fourth and final game of the series, Yankees announcer Mel Allen was calling the top of the ninth inning for NBC when his voice gave out due to a bout of severe laryngitis, forcing Dodgers announcer Vin Scully (who had called the first four-and-a-half innings of the game per the network's usual setup) to resume play-by-play duties for the remainder of the game. After the Series New York Daily News sportswriter Dick Young opined that Allen, the voice of the Yankees, had been stricken by "psychosomatic laryngitis" caused by his team being swept.
1964 – Locally, the NBC feed was carried in New York by WPIX, the Yankees' flagship TV station, and WNBC-TV, the New York City NBC affiliate; and in St. Louis by KSD-TV, the Cardinals' flagship TV station as well as the St. Louis NBC affiliate. 
In 1964, the Yankees made the World Series for the 15th time in 19 years—but Mel Allen wasn't there. Back in September, before the end of the season, the Yankees informed Allen that his contract with the team would not be renewed.  In those days, the main announcers for the Series participants always called the World Series on NBC. Although Allen was thus technically eligible to call the Series, Baseball Commissioner Ford Frick honored the Yankees' request to have Phil Rizzuto join the Series crew instead. It was the first time Allen had missed a World Series for which the Yankees were eligible since 1943, and only the second World Series (not counting those missed during World War II) that he'd missed since he began calling baseball games in 1938. On December 17, after much media speculation and many letters to the Yankees from fans disgruntled at Allen's absence from the Series, the Yankees issued a terse press release announcing Allen's firing; he was replaced by Joe Garagiola, who'd teamed with Rizzuto on the Series. NBC and Movietone dropped him soon afterward.  To this day, the Yankees have never given an explanation for Allen's sudden firing, and rumors abounded.  Depending on the rumor, Allen was either homosexual, an alcoholic, a drug addict, or had suffered a nervous breakdown. Allen's sexuality was sometimes a target in those more conservative days because he hadn't married (and never did). Years later, Allen told author Curt Smith that the Yankees had fired him under pressure from the team's longtime sponsor, Ballantine Beer. According to Allen, he was fired as a cost-cutting move by Ballantine, which had been experiencing poor sales for years (it would eventually be sold in 1969). Smith, in his book Voices of Summer, also indicated that the medications Allen took in order to maintain his busy schedule may have affected his on-air performance. (Stephen Borelli, another biographer, has also pointed out that Allen's heavy workload didn't allow him time to take care of his health.)
1965 – Locally, the NBC feed was carried in Los Angeles by KTTV, the Dodgers' flagship TV station, and KNBC, the Los Angeles NBC affiliate; and in Minnesota by WTCN-TV, the Twins' flagship TV station, and KSTP-TV, the Twin Cities NBC affiliate.
1966 – Locally, the NBC feed was carried in Baltimore by WJZ-TV, the Orioles' flagship TV station, and WBAL-TV, the Baltimore NBC affiliate; and in Los Angeles by KTTV, the Dodgers' flagship TV station, and KNBC, the Los Angeles NBC affiliate.
Prior to 1966, NBC typically paired the top announcers for the respective World Series teams to alternate play-by-play during each game's telecast. For example, if the Yankees played the Dodgers in the World Series, Mel Allen (representing the Yankees) would call half the game and Vin Scully (representing the Dodgers) would call the rest of the game. However, in 1966, NBC wanted their regular network announcer, Curt Gowdy, to call most of the play-by-play at the expense of the top local announcers. The visiting teams' announcers participated in the NBC Radio broadcasts. In broadcasts of Series-clinching (or potentially Series-clinching) games on both media, NBC sent the announcer for whichever team was ahead in the game to that team's clubhouse in the ninth inning in order to help cover the trophy presentation and conduct post-game interviews.
1967 – Locally, the NBC feed was carried in St. Louis by KSD-TV, the Cardinals' flagship TV station as well as the St. Louis NBC affiliate; and in Boston by WHDH-TV, the Red Sox' flagship TV station, and WBZ-TV, the Boston NBC affiliate.
1968 – Locally, the NBC feed was carried in Detroit by WJBK, the Tigers' flagship TV station, and WWJ-TV, the Detroit NBC affiliate; and in St. Louis by KSD-TV, the Cardinals' flagship TV station as well as the St. Louis NBC affiliate.
1969 – Locally, the NBC feed was carried in New York by WOR-TV, the Mets' flagship TV station, and WNBC-TV, the New York City NBC affiliate; and in Baltimore by WJZ-TV, the Orioles' flagship TV station, and WBAL-TV, the Baltimore NBC affiliate. 
Games 3–5 of the 1969 World Series are believed to be the oldest surviving color television broadcasts of World Series games (even though World Series telecasts have aired in color since ). However, they were "truck feeds" in that they do not contain original commercials, but show a static image of the Shea Stadium field between innings.

1950s

Notes
By , World Series games could be seen in most of the country, but not all. Also in 1950, the Mutual Broadcasting System acquired the exclusive television broadcast rights to the World Series and All-Star Game for the next six years. Mutual, which had no television network at the time (and indeed never developed one), may have been reindulging in TV network dreams or simply taking advantage of a long-standing business relationship; in either case, the network sold its rights to NBC in time for the following season's games at an enormous profit.
 marked the first time that the World Series was televised exclusively by one network (NBC), as well as the first time it was televised from coast to coast.
 – Brooklyn Dodgers announcer Red Barber wanted a higher fee from Gillette, which sponsored the World Series telecasts on NBC, than was offered. When Dodgers owner Walter O'Malley refused to back him, Barber declined Gillette's fee, and his then-assistant Vin Scully (who at 25 years of age became the youngest announcer to call the play-by-play of a World Series, a distinction which still stands) was partnered with the New York Yankees' Mel Allen during the series instead. In his 1968 autobiography Rhubarb in the Catbird Seat, Barber claims O'Malley's lack of support as his reason for subsequently resigning from the Dodgers' booth and joining the Yankees' prior to the 1954 season.
 marked the first time that the World Series was televised in color.
1959 – Locally, the NBC feed was carried in Los Angeles by KTTV, the Dodgers' flagship TV station, and KRCA, the Los Angeles NBC station; and in Chicago by WGN-TV, the White Sox' flagship TV station, and WNBQ, the Chicago NBC station.
Chicago White Sox announcer Bob Elson missed a chance to call the series – the team's first since 1919 and Elson's first since 1943 – to a national audience because the then-head of NBC Sports, Tom Gallery (who incidentally, grew up on the same block as Elson) didn't like him. Elson was, however, permitted to call a re-creation of the series over White Sox radio flagship WCFL.

1940s

Notes
The 1947 World Series was only seen in four markets via coaxial inter-connected stations: New York City; Philadelphia; Schenectady/Albany, New York; Washington, D.C.; and, environs surrounding these cities. Outside of New York, coverage was pooled.
The October 1947 Billboard reported over 3.9 million viewing the games, primarily on TV sets located in bars (5,400 tavern TV sets in NYC alone). The October 13, 1947 edition of Time magazine reported that President Truman, who had just made the first Oval Office TV appearance on October 5, 1947, and received the first TV for the White House, watched parts of the Series but "skipped the last innings".
Note on : Games in Boston were only seen in the Northeast. Meanwhile, games in Cleveland were only seen in the Midwest and Pittsburgh. The games were open to all channels with a network affiliation. In all, the 1948 World Series was televised to fans in seven Midwestern cities: Cleveland, Chicago, Detroit, Milwaukee, St. Louis, and Toledo.
Tom Hussey helped Red Barber call Games 1–2 and 6 in Boston, while Van Patrick assisted Barber in calling Games 3–5 in Cleveland.
By , World Series games could now be seen east of the Mississippi River. The games were open to all channels with a network affiliation.

Surviving telecasts
This is a full record of World Series telecasts prior to 1975 that are known to exist in whole or part:

 (Yankees–Dodgers) – The complete telecasts of Games 6 and 7 exist, preserved on kinescope by sponsor Gillette.
 (Yankees–Dodgers) – Sections of Game 5 exist and have been released on DVD.
 (Yankees–Dodgers) – The last three innings of Game 2 are known to exist. Game 3 is complete with original commercials, pre and post game show except for innings 2 and 3 and is available on DVD. Game 5, Don Larsen's perfect game, is complete except for the first inning. Game 5 was aired on the first night of the MLB Network on January 1, 2009, and is now available on DVD.   Game 7 is complete except for the 2nd and 3rd innings and has also been released on DVD.
 (Yankees–Braves) – Games 1, 2 and 5 exist in their entirety and have been released on DVD. All of Game 3 (except for a snip of Tony Kubek's second home run in the top 7th inning) exists, as does the first six innings of Game 6 (both also released on DVD). Game 7 is believed to exist but has not been released.
 (Yankees–Pirates) – A complete kinescope of Game 7 was discovered in the former home of Bing Crosby in December 2009. The game was rebroadcast by MLB Network in December 2010, and is now available on DVD.
 (Yankees–Reds) – Only half-hour segments of Game 3 (the final two innings), Game 4 (the 4th and 5th inning) and Game 5 (the opening and top of the 1st inning) are known to exist.
 (Yankees–Dodgers) – Only a brief section of Game 3 is known to exist. An excerpt appears in the Yankeeography series (out on DVD).
 (Twins–Dodgers) – All seven games exist, preserved on kinescope by the CBC. Also, it is the earliest World Series whose telecasts are known to survive in their entirety.
 (Tigers–Cardinals). All seven games exist, preserved on kinescope by the CBC.
 (Orioles–Mets). Games 1 and 2 have been preserved on kinescope by the CBC. Meanwhile, Games 3–5 exist in their original color videotape quality from "truck feeds", including pregames with Jim Simpson, Sandy Koufax and Mickey Mantle.
 (Orioles–Reds). Games 1–4 have been preserved on kinescope by the CBC. Meanwhile, Game 5 exists in its original color videotape quality from the "truck feed."
 (Orioles–Pirates). Games 1, 2, 6 and 7 exist in their complete forms. Games 3, 4 and 5 survive in partial form. These include pregame shows for six of the seven games, featuring Joe Garagiola and Sandy Koufax.
 (A's–Reds) – Game 4 is the only complete game extant, along with most of Game 5, and some of Game 2. Only fragments remain from Games 1, 3 and 6; The complete pregame show and condensed action of the first three innings of Game 7 exist from a home recording.
 (A's–Mets) – Game 1 is the only complete game extant. Game 2 (which lasted four-plus hours) is missing various bits, including the last inning and a half (including both crucial Mike Andrews misplays at second base). Game 3 is complete except for the last inning. Game 4 lasts from just the pregame show to the top of the 4th inning. All that remains of Game 5 are the final two innings. Game 6 is entirely missing, and Game 7 cuts off with one out in the top of the 9th inning, missing the postgame celebrations. A 20-minute presentation tape of Series highlights, narrated by Curt Gowdy, was submitted to the Peabody Awards. The Peabody tape includes the two key Mike Andrews plays from Game 2, otherwise missing from the network archives.
 (A's–Dodgers) – Games 1–4 are complete, Game 5 exists in partial form.

Radio

2020s

Notes 

 In 2021, TUDN Radio acquired the Spanish-language rights to Major League Baseball games, starting with that year's postseason.

2010s

Notes
ESPN Radio broadcast the 2010 World Series nationally, with Jon Miller (who worked the San Francisco Giants' local radio broadcasts during the regular season) calling his 13th consecutive World Series as the network's play-by-play announcer, and Joe Morgan providing commentary on his 11th World Series for ESPN Radio and his 14th overall (counting three Series telecasts for NBC). The games were the last that Miller and Morgan (who had also been calling Sunday Night Baseball for ESPN television since 1990) would work together, as the network subsequently announced that their contracts would not be renewed for 2011. ESPN Deportes Radio also aired the Series to Spanish language listeners, with Eduardo Ortega and former Giants pitcher Juan Marichal announcing. 
In the UK, the Series was broadcast by BBC Radio Five Live Sports Extra, with Jonny Gould and Josh Chetwynd commentating.
Locally, the two teams' flagship stations broadcast the series with their respective announcing crews, with an additional requirement of acknowledging AutoZone, ESPN Radio's baseball broadcasting sponsor. The Giants' English-language broadcasts aired on KNBR (with Dave Flemming, Duane Kuiper, and Mike Krukow announcing) with their Spanish-language broadcasts on KIQI-AM (with Erwin Higueros and Tito Fuentes), while KRLD-FM and AM carried the Rangers' English-language broadcasts (with Eric Nadel and Dave Barnett) and KFLC-AM had their Spanish-language broadcasts (with Eleno Ornelas and Jerry Romo). Due to contractual obligations, the non-flagship stations on the teams' radio networks carried the ESPN Radio broadcasts of the games, although the local broadcasts were also available on XM Satellite Radio and to Gameday Audio subscribers at MLB.com.
ESPN Radio broadcast the 2011 World Series nationally. This was the first World Series for play-by play announcer Dan Shulman and analysts Orel Hershiser and Bobby Valentine. ESPN Deportes Radio aired the Series for Spanish language listeners, with Ernesto Jerez and Guillermo Celis announcing. 
Locally, the two teams' flagship stations broadcast the Series with their respective announcing crews. The Rangers' broadcasts aired on KESN (with Eric Nadel and Steve Busby announcing), while the Cardinals' broadcasts aired on KMOX (with Mike Shannon and John Rooney announcing). Due to contractual obligations, the non-flagship stations on the teams' radio networks carried the ESPN Radio broadcasts of the games, although the local broadcasts were available on XM Satellite Radio and to Gameday Audio subscribers at MLB.com. In the United Kingdom, Simon Brotherton and Josh Chetwynd called the games for BBC Radio 5 Live Sports Extra.
ESPN Radio broadcast the 2012 World Series nationally, with Dan Shulman and Orel Hershiser working their second consecutive World Series together. ESPN Deportes Radio aired the Series for Spanish language listeners, with Ernesto Jerez and Guillermo Celis announcing. 
Locally, the two teams' flagship stations broadcast the series with their respective announcing crews. The Giants' English-language broadcasts aired on KNBR (with Dave Flemming, Jon Miller, Mike Krukow, and Duane Kuiper announcing) with their Spanish-language broadcasts on KIQI-AM (with Erwin Higueros and Tito Fuentes), while WXYT-FM and AM carried the Tigers' English-language broadcasts (with Dan Dickerson and Jim Price). Due to contractual obligations, the non-flagship stations on the teams' radio networks carried the ESPN Radio broadcasts of the games, although the local broadcasts were also available on XM Satellite Radio and to Gameday Audio subscribers at MLB.com.
ESPN Radio broadcast the 2013 World Series in the U.S., with commentators Dan Shulman and Orel Hershiser. 
Locally, the two teams' flagship radio stations broadcast the series with their respective announcing crews. Mike Shannon and John Rooney called the games for the Cardinals on KMOX in St. Louis, while Joe Castiglione, Dave O'Brien, and Lou Merloni announced for the Red Sox on WEEI in Boston.
ESPN Radio aired the 2014 World Series, with Dan Shulman on play-by-play and Aaron Boone handling color commentary. Marc Kestecher anchored pre- and post-game coverage for the network along with Jon Sciambi, Chris Singleton and Peter Pascarelli. ESPN Deportes Radio offered a Spanish-language broadcast, with Eduardo Ortega announcing along with Renato Bermúdez, Armando Talavera and José Francisco Rivera. 
Locally, the series was broadcast on the teams' flagship radio stations with their respective announcing crews. In San Francisco, KNBR aired the games in English (with Jon Miller, Duane Kuiper, Mike Krukow and Dave Flemming announcing), while KTRB broadcast in Spanish (with Erwin Higueros and Tito Fuentes announcing). In Kansas City, KCSP broadcast the games (with Denny Matthews and Ryan Lefebvre announcing). Due to contractual obligations, the affiliate stations on the teams' radio networks had to carry the ESPN Radio feed of the games, although the local broadcasts were also available on Sirius and XM satellite radio and to Gameday Audio subscribers at MLB.com. In Kansas City, WHB carried the ESPN Radio feed in direct competition with KCSP's broadcast. This was the first World Series for which Jon Miller, who had been the Giants' primary radio announcer since 1997, called the final (see Note below), championship-clinching out to a local San Francisco audience.
ESPN Radio aired the 2015 World Series, with Dan Shulman on play-by-play, Aaron Boone handling color commentary, and Buster Olney serving as field reporter. Tampa Bay Rays pitcher Chris Archer served as a guest commentator for selected innings in Games 1, 2 and 5. Marc Kestecher anchored pre-game and post-game coverage for the network along with Chris Singleton and Peter Pascarelli. 
Locally, the series was broadcast on the teams' flagship radio stations with their respective announcing crews. In New York, WOR aired the games in English, with Howie Rose and Josh Lewin announcing, while WEPN-AM aired the games in Spanish, with Juan Alicea and Max Pérez Jiménez announcing. In Kansas City, KCSP broadcast the games, with Denny Matthews, Ryan Lefebvre, Steve Stewart, and Steve Physioc announcing. WEPN-FM and WHB, the ESPN Radio affiliates in New York and Kansas City respectively, aired the network's coverage of the series in those cities.
ESPN Radio's national network covered the 2016 World Series through affiliated stations, with Dan Shulman providing the play-by-play and Aaron Boone serving as color analyst. Tampa Bay Rays pitcher Chris Archer appeared as a guest analyst for select innings of Games 1 and 2. 
Locally, the teams' flagship stations broadcast the series with their regular announcers. In Cleveland, WTAM (1100) and WMMS (100.7) carried the Indians' play-by-play with Tom Hamilton and Jim Rosenhaus, while in Chicago, WSCR (670) carried the Cubs' play-by-play with Pat Hughes, Ron Coomer, and Len Kasper. The affiliate stations of the teams' regional radio networks, however, were contractually obligated to carry the national ESPN Radio feed.
ESPN Radio broadcast the 2017 World Series nationally in English, with Dan Shulman providing the play-by-play and Aaron Boone serving as color analyst. Marc Kestecher hosted the pre-game and post-game coverage along with analyst Chris Singleton and reporters Buster Olney and Tim Kurkjian. The ESPN Radio coverage was carried on affiliated stations throughout the United States and Canada, as well as online at ESPN.com and via the ESPN mobile app. Spanish-language coverage was provided by ESPN Deportes Radio, with Eduardo Ortega, Renato Bermúdez, José Francisco Rivera, and Orlando Hernández announcing. 
Locally, both teams' flagship radio stations broadcast the series with their regular announcers. Sportstalk 790 aired the English-language broadcast for the Houston area, with Robert Ford and Steve Sparks calling the games.  In Los Angeles, AM 570 LA Sports aired the English-language broadcast, with Charley Steiner and Rick Monday announcing. In Spanish, Univision America 1020 carried the broadcast, with Jaime Jarrín and Jorge Jarrín on the call. In Korean, Radio Korea 1540 aired the series, with Richard Choi and Chong Ho Yim in the booth.
 – ESPN Radio broadcast the World Series in English for the 21st straight year. Dan Shulman called the play-by-play, with Chris Singleton serving as color analyst and Buster Olney as field reporter. Marc Kestecher hosted the pre-game and post-game coverage with Olney and Tim Kurkjian reporting. Jon Sciambi called the play-by-play for Game 5 due to Shulman developing laryngitis. ESPN Deportes Radio provided Spanish-language coverage of the Series. Eduardo Ortega called the play-by-play and Orlando Hernández, Renato Bermudez, and José Francisco Rivera served as analysts. 
Locally, both teams' flagship radio stations broadcast the series with their regular announcers, which were simulcast over SiriusXM radio. In Los Angeles, the broadcast was on AM 570 LA Sports with Charley Steiner and Rick Monday in English, on Univision America 1020 with Jaime Jarrín and Jorge Jarrín in Spanish, and on Radio Korea 1540 AM in Korean. The Red Sox broadcast was on WEEI 93.7 FM in English with Joe Castiglione, Tim Neverett and Lou Merloni, and in Spanish on WCCM 1490 AM with Uri Berenguer.
 – ESPN Radio broadcast the World Series for the 22nd straight year, with coverage presented by AutoZone. Dan Shulman served as play-by-play announcer, with Chris Singleton as color commentator and Buster Olney as field reporter. Marc Kestecher and Kevin Winter hosted the pregame shows with reporter Tim Kurkjian. New Spanish-language radio network Unanimo Deportes, flagshipped at WMYM Miami, broadcast its first World Series with Beto Ferreiro and Orlando Hernández announcing.
Locally, both teams' flagship radio stations broadcast the series with their regular announcers. In Houston, KBME aired the series with Robert Ford and  Steve Sparks announcing. In Washington, WJFK-FM aired the series with Charlie Slowes and Dave Jageler calling the games. Per MLB rules, the teams' other radio affiliates were permitted to carry the series but were required to air the ESPN Radio broadcast.

2000s

Notes
During Game 3 of the 2000 World Series, ESPN Radio announcer Jon Miller was forced to leave the booth after the top of the first inning due to an upper respiratory infection. Charley Steiner, who was serving as a pre-game host and field reporter for the network, filled in on play-by-play for the rest of the game; Miller resumed his duties in Game 4 of the Series.
2001 – ESPN Radio provided national radio coverage for the fourth consecutive year, with Jon Miller and Joe Morgan calling the action.
Locally, the Series was broadcast by KTAR-AM in Phoenix with Thom Brennaman, Greg Schulte, Rod Allen and Jim Traber, and by WABC-AM in New York City with John Sterling and Michael Kay. This would be Sterling and Kay's last World Series working together, and Game 7 would be the last Yankee broadcast on WABC. Kay moved to television and the new YES Network the following season and WCBS picked up radio rights to the Yankees. It was Kay who announced Derek Jeter's game-winning home run in Game 4 of the series and subsequently anointed him as "Mr. November".
Jon Miller, who called the 2002 World Series for ESPN Radio, has been play-by-play man for the San Francisco Giants since 1997. Coincidentally, KNBR, the Giants' longtime flagship station, was also San Francisco's ESPN Radio affiliate at the time.
Locally, the 2002 World Series was broadcast by KLAC-AM in Los Angeles with Rory Markas and Terry Smith, and by KNBR in San Francisco with Duane Kuiper, Joe Angel, and Mike Krukow.
Locally, KTRH-AM and WMVP were the primary carriers for the 2005 World Series in the Houston and Chicago markets. For KTRH long time Astros voice Milo Hamilton provided play-by-play while John Rooney called the games for the White Sox. Game 4 was Rooney's last call after seventeen years as the radio voice of the White Sox, as he left to take the same position with the St. Louis Cardinals.
2006 – Locally, Dan Dickerson and Jim Price called the Series for the Tigers on WXYT-AM in Detroit (with retired, longtime Tiger announcer Ernie Harwell returning to call the second inning of Game 1), while Mike Shannon and John Rooney called it for the Cardinals on KTRS-AM in St. Louis. Per contractual obligation, the non-flagship stations on the teams' radio networks carried the ESPN Radio broadcasts. John Rooney had broadcast the 2005 Series for the Chicago White Sox, and thus became the first announcer to call back-to-back World Series championships as an employee of different teams.
2007 – Locally, Joe Castiglione and Glenn Geffner called the Series for the Red Sox on WRKO in Boston, while Jack Corrigan and Jeff Kingery called it for the Rockies on KOA in Denver. Per contractual obligation, the non-flagship stations on the teams' radio networks carried the ESPN Radio broadcasts.
On radio, the 2008 World Series was broadcast nationally by ESPN Radio with Jon Miller and Joe Morgan announcing, and a Spanish broadcast on ESPN Deportes Radio. 
Locally, Dave Wills, Andy Freed, Dewayne Staats and Joe Magrane called the Series in English for the Rays on WHNZ-AM in Tampa, with Ricardo Tavaras and Enrique Oliu working the Spanish broadcast on St. Petersburg's WGES-AM. Harry Kalas, Scott Franzke, Larry Andersen, and Chris Wheeler called the Phillies' English broadcasts on WPHT-AM in Philadelphia, with Spanish announcers Danny Martinez, Bill Kulik and Juan Ramos on WUBA. Following their contractual obligations, the non-flagship stations on the teams' radio networks carried the ESPN Radio broadcasts. MLB.com also carried the local radio broadcasts for online streaming, while XM Satellite Radio aired the local and national feeds to its subscribers. For Harry Kalas, this series brought together a father and son calling the series for different teams, with his son, Todd, calling the Series in English for the Rays. This World Series win had significance for Fox's Tim McCarver and Harry Kalas. McCarver was a backup commentator for Game of the Week on NBC, but he was not part of the broadcast team that called the final out. For Kalas, MLB radio-broadcasting regulations forbade local stations from producing live coverage of World Series games, instead forcing them to air the national CBS Radio feed of the games. Philadelphia fans were so outraged about this afterward that they started a letter-writing campaign to the Commissioner's Office, demanding a change to the rule. The following year, MLB amended its broadcasting contracts to allow World Series teams' flagship radio stations to air the games with local announcers, due at least in part to this outcry from Philadelphia fans. In 2008, both called the Phillies' World Series win.
2009 – The flagship radio stations of the respective teams broadcast all Series games with their local announcers. In Philadelphia, WPHT carried the Phillies' English-language broadcasts, with Scott Franzke, Larry Andersen, Tom McCarthy, Gary Matthews, and Chris Wheeler announcing, while WUBA aired the team's Spanish broadcasts. In New York, WCBS-AM carried the Yankees' English broadcasts with John Sterling and Suzyn Waldman announcing. This broadcast made Waldman the first woman to announce a World Series game on radio. XM Satellite Radio offered multiple feeds of each game to its subscribers.

1990s

Notes
1990 – Vin Scully returned to CBS Radio's coverage of the World Series for the first time since 1982 (Scully then called the 1984, 1986 and 1988 World Series for NBC television), calling the series alongside Johnny Bench. Scully would go on to call the next six series for CBS, first with Bench and later with Jeff Torborg.
1992 – Locally, the Series was called on WGST-AM in Atlanta by Skip Caray, Pete Van Wieren, Joe Simpson, and Don Sutton, and on CJCL-AM in Toronto by Jerry Howarth and Tom Cheek.
The national radio broadcast of the 1993 World Series was also provided by CBS, with Vin Scully and Johnny Bench on the call. Game 6 marked Johnny Bench's final broadcast for CBS Radio after nine years.
Locally, the Series was called on WOGL-AM in Philadelphia by Harry Kalas, Richie Ashburn, Chris Wheeler and Andy Musser, and on CJCL-AM in Toronto by Jerry Howarth and Tom Cheek.  Cheek's call of the Carter home run ("Touch 'em all Joe, you'll never hit a bigger home run in your life!") lives on in Blue Jays folklore. This was Richie Ashburn's last World Series as a Phillies broadcaster, as he died in 1997. Andy Musser also called his last World Series as a member of the Phillies' broadcast team; he retired in 2001 and died eleven years later. Tom Cheek never called another postseason game in his role as voice of the Blue Jays, from which he retired in 2005 prior to his death from brain cancer. Meanwhile, Harry Kalas would not call another World Series until 2008. Kalas later died in 2009 prior to a game at Nationals Park in Washington, D.C.. Chris Wheeler continues to call games for the Phillies although in a limited capacity and Jerry Howarth has continued to call Blue Jays games, moving into the primary play-by-play position following the death of Cheek.
The 1997 World Series is the last World Series to date to be broadcast by the CBS Radio Network, who had covered the World Series consecutively since . Vin Scully and Jeff Torborg called the 1997 World Series for CBS Radio (the latter had once managed the Cleveland Indians and would later manage the Florida Marlins). ESPN Radio would take over the national radio contract for Major League Baseball. This was Scully's eleventh and final call for CBS Radio in the World Series, and seventh consecutive since he rejoined the network following NBC's 1989 loss of baseball. As of 2011, this is also the last World Series broadcast to date for Scully who, in addition to his eleven CBS Radio World Series calls has called fourteen others for NBC and the Los Angeles Dodgers.). Torborg would continue to call games for Fox television until the end of the 2000 season, working alongside John Rooney and Chip Caray, when he elected to return to managing and was hired by the Montreal Expos.
Game 7 was the final Major League Baseball game called by longtime Indians radio announcer Herb Score, as he retired at season's end. Score's broadcast partner, Tom Hamilton, would take over as lead announcer the following year. It also marked the final game carried by Indians flagship station WKNR; the broadcast rights would be moved to WTAM for the 1998 season.

1980s

Notes
That was mainly because Jack Buck had a lengthy career calling Cardinals games for KMOX (a station owned by CBS until 2018) to go along with his national work for CBS Radio.
A local announcer for the visiting team would appear on the network's broadcast in the top of the fifth, with the home team announcer doing so in the bottom of the fifth.
In 1986, CBS Radio used Rick Dempsey as a reporter.
Locally, the series was called on WHN-AM in New York by Bob Murphy and Gary Thorne, and on WPLM-FM in Boston by Ken Coleman and Joe Castiglione.
Jack Buck and Bill White provided commentary for the 1988 World Series for CBS Radio. It was White's last World Series as a broadcaster, as he left broadcasting to become President of the National League following the final game. This was Buck's call of Kirk Gibson's game-winning home run off of Dennis Eckersley in Game 1. It begins here with Buck speculating on what might happen if Gibson manages to reach base: 

On October 17, CBS Radio commentators Jack Buck, Johnny Bench and John Rooney were on hand at San Francisco's Candlestick Park for Game 3 of the World Series between the San Francisco Giants and Oakland Athletics. At 5:04 p.m. local time, the Loma Prieta earthquake hit (and subsequently caused a ten-day delay for the World Series). Unlike ABC-Television (with Al Michaels, Jim Palmer and Tim McCarver calling the action on the TV side), CBS Radio was in a commercial break when the earthquake struck. After the earthquake hit, Jack Buck told the listening audience, "I must say about Johnny Bench, folks, if he moved that fast when he played, he would have never hit into a double play. I never saw anybody move that fast in my life."
This was Buck's seventh and last World Series call for CBS Radio, as he moved to CBS' television coverage of baseball the following year. Bench continued to call the World Series on radio through 1993 as Vin Scully's color man.
Locally, the 1989 World Series was broadcast by KSFO-AM in San Francisco with Bill King, Lon Simmons and Ray Fosse, and by KNBR in San Francisco with Hank Greenwald and Ron Fairly.

1970s

Notes
In addition, CBS Radio used Marty Brennaman in 1976, when his Cincinnati Reds played against White's Yankees. 
 Win Elliot served as a color commentator on CBS Radio's coverage from 1976 to 1978, teaming with the respective local play-by-play announcers for each game's broadcast.
In 1977, Bill White did play-by-play for the games in Los Angeles on CBS Radio while Ross Porter handled the play-by-play for CBS in New York. Thus, when White was appearing on ABC-TV during the 1977 World Series, it was during the home games in a pre/postgame role (White would eventually cover the trophy presentation ceremony for ABC). Likewise, Porter handled the ABC pre/postgame while in Los Angeles.
 was the first year in which one announcer (in this case, CBS Radio's Vin Scully) provided all of the play-by-play for a World Series radio broadcast. In prior years, the play-by-play announcers and color commentators had alternated roles during each game or between games.
CBS Radio, following the lead begun by ABC's television coverage in 1977, dropped the usage of local team broadcasters on play-by-play when Vin Scully began doing the World Series as a CBS employee through 1982. (Beginning in 1982, however, the participating teams' flagship radio stations were permitted to produce their own local World Series broadcasts and air them live. The affiliate stations in the teams' radio networks continued to be obligated to carry the CBS Radio broadcasts.)

1960s

Notes
Beginning in 1966 and continuing through 1975, a local announcer for the visiting team in each Series game would split play-by-play and color commentary with a neutral NBC Radio announcer. Prior to 1966 and going back to the dawn of the television era, Series radio broadcasts typically featured announcers from around the major leagues (generally pairing one announcer from an AL team and another from an NL team), with the regular announcers for both the home and visiting Series participants splitting play-by-play on NBC television. In broadcasts of Series-clinching (or potentially Series-clinching) games on both media, NBC sent the announcer for whichever team was ahead in the game to that team's clubhouse in the ninth inning in order to help cover the trophy presentation and conduct post-game interviews.

1950s

Notes
 NBC Radio succeeded Mutual as the exclusive World Series radio network beginning in 1957.

1940s

1930s

Notes
Fred Hoey was hired by CBS to call Games 1 and 5 of the 1933 World Series after commissioner Kenesaw Mountain Landis declared that CBS' Ted Husing and NBC's Graham McNamee could not call World Series play-by-play because they hadn't called any regular season games. Hoey was removed from the CBS broadcast during the fourth inning of Game 1 after his voice gave out on the air. Although he was subsequently reported as having suffered from a cold, Hoey's garbled and incoherent speech led many listeners to think he was drunk. After this incident, Hoey never went into a broadcast booth without a tin of throat lozenges.
The 1934 World Series broadcasts were the first to be sponsored, with Ford giving US$50,000 each to CBS and NBC. Commissioner Landis barred Detroit Tigers announcer Ty Tyson from appearing on network radio, citing the risk of partiality in his commentary; however, after Tigers fans sent in more than 600,000 letters of protest, Landis agreed to allow Tyson to call the Series locally on Detroit station WWJ.
In 1939, Mutual and Gillette signed an agreement purchasing exclusive broadcast and sponsorship rights to the World Series for US$100,000. A special promotion of Gillette razors and blueblades sold four times better than preliminary estimates, leading the company to secure additional sports sponsorships. The Gillette stable of sports broadcasts, which aired under the umbrella title of Gillette Cavalcade of Sports, spanned several different networks (including NBC, CBS, and Mutual radio) and grew to include not only ongoing sponsorship of baseball's World Series and All-Star Game but also the annual Kentucky Derby in horseracing, the Rose Bowl Game and other college football games, and professional boxing. Mutual continued as the exclusive World Series radio network through 1956, while Gillette's exclusive sponsorship of the event extended into the early television era and continued until the late 1950s.

1920s

Notes
Before radio, reporters would telegraph World Series info to centers where game boards were set up to display to thousands.
The 1921 World Series was broadcast over radio stations KDKA in Pittsburgh, Pennsylvania, WBZ in Springfield, Massachusetts, and WJZ in Newark, New Jersey. KDKA's coverage, featuring play-by-play commentary from Grantland Rice, was live, direct, and exclusive from the Polo Grounds. Meanwhile, WBZ and WJZ coverage was relayed and re-created by Tommy Cowan. Sandy Hunt, a sportswriter for the Newark Sunday Call, sent play-by-play reports/summaries to Cowan via the telephone.
Note on  through : World Series coverage carried by Westinghouse Broadcasting was available to any commercially operated radio station.
The 1923 World Series featured the first true, stadium originated radio broadcast of World Series games. Bill McGeehan did the play-by-play honors at first. However, when McGeehan reportedly tired of the chore, he quit in the middle of Game 3. Shortly thereafter, Graham McNamee took over play-by-play duties.
AT&T fed the 1923 World Series coverage by New York's WEAF via their long-distance lines to stations as far north as Massachusetts and as far south as Washington, D.C.
The 1927 World Series was the first to be broadcast from coast to coast over a full radio network.

Local radio
Since 1982, the participating teams' flagship radio stations are permitted to air their own World Series broadcasts with their regular announcing crews, and their audio is made available as usual through MLB's digital presences and Sirius XM. However, the teams' other radio network affiliates are contractually obligated to carry the national radio feeds. The flagship stations also much mention the coverage as being presented by the same sponsor as the ESPN Radio broadcasts.

2020s

2010s

2000s

1990s

1980s

Notes
 marked the first time that teams' flagship radio stations were permitted to produce their own local World Series broadcasts and air them live. In prior years, these stations were contractually required to carry the national radio networks' broadcasts (although they could produce re-created games with local announcers and air them after the Series had ended). The affiliate stations in the teams' radio networks continued to be obligated to carry the national broadcasts. 
After thousands of Phillies fans—outraged over being unable to hear local team announcers Harry Kalas and Richie Ashburn call the games during the 1980 World Series—deluged the team, the networks, and the Commissioner's office with angry letters and petitions, Major League Baseball changed its broadcast contract to allow the flagship radio stations for participating World Series teams to produce and air their own local Series broadcasts beginning in 1982.
That was mainly because Jack Buck had a lengthy career calling Cardinals games for KMOX to go along with his national work for CBS Radio.

Sources

External links

A Comprehensive History of the World Series
World Series TV Analysis & Ratings
Baseball-Reference.com > Postseason
WorldSeries.com
World Series Video
Baseball's Best | MLB.com: Programming
Welcome to Archival Television Audio, INC
Audio Recordings – Historic Radio Broadcasts (1930's–1959)
Audio Recordings – Historic Radio Broadcasts (1960 – Today)
Danrick Enterprises – Officially Licensed Audio Tape Recordings of Historic Baseball Radio Broadcasts
The Sports Poster Warehouse – MLB World Series Video Disc Sets
TSB (The Sound of Baseball) Heritage
Sportscasting Firsts (1920–present) by Lou Schwartz
The hunt for TV's lost baseball treasures
Summer 1997: 75 Years of National Baseball Broadcasts
Fang's Bites – World Series
Scully still best of Series announcers– Times Union
Slim pickings to rank all the World Series analysts
Searchable Network TV Broadcasts
THE HUMBLE (AD-FREE!) ORIGINS OF THE FIRST WORLD SERIES BROADCASTS
Baseball Game page #1
Baseball Game page #2
Baseball Game page #3
Baseball Game page #4
Baseball Game page #5
Episode List: World Series - TV Tango

Broadcasters
Major League Baseball on the radio
ESPN Radio
ESPN announcers
CBS Radio Sports
NBC Radio Sports
+World Series
Westinghouse Broadcasting
Mutual Broadcasting System
ABC Sports
CBS Sports
Major League Baseball on NBC
CBC Sports
CTV Sports
Sportsnet
Major League Baseball on Fox